The Order of Merit for National Foundation (Hangul: 건국훈장) is one of South Korea's orders of merit. It is awarded by the President of South Korea for "outstanding meritorious services in the interest of founding or laying a foundation for the Republic of Korea." The Order was originally established under a slightly different name  건국공로훈장 (建國功勞勳章) by Presidential Decree #82, on Apr. 27, 1949, and is the oldest Order of the Republic of Korea. On January 16, 1967, there were major changes made to the Order of National Foundation under Presidential Decree #2929.  The name of the Order was shortened from 건국공로훈장 (建國功勞勳章) to 건국훈장 (建國勳章), and all three classes got new names and designs.

Grades 
The Order of Merit for National Foundation is awarded in five grades.

Recipients 
By 2005 about 8,000 people had received the Order. Many of its recipients have only been awarded the Order posthumously, often because they died before it was established; these include Kim Gu, An Jung-geun, and Cho Man-sik.

See also
Orders, decorations, and medals of South Korea

References

External links
Images of the Order of Merit for National Foundation (in Korean with some English)

Government of South Korea
National Foundation, Order

Awards established in 1949
1949 establishments in South Korea